Ritva Annikki Vepsä (12 February 1941, Helsinki – 30 July 2016) was a Finnish actress. In 1970 she received a Jussi Award as the Best Leading Actress for her appearances in a Jörn Donner film Sixtynine 69 and a Risto Jarva film Ruusujen aika. Vepsä was married to actor and director Yrjö Tähtelä 1960–79. Vepsä died on 30 July 2016, aged 75, at her home from lung cancer.

Selected filmography
Nuori mylläri (1958)
Totuus on armoton (1963)
Onnelliset leikit (1964)
Time of Roses (1969)
Sixtynine 69 (1969)
Naisenkuvia (1970)
Loma (1976)
Koeputkiaikuinen ja Simon enkelit (1979)
Pedon merkki (1981)
Rampe & Naukkis – kaikkien aikojen superpari (1990)

References

External links 
 

1941 births
2016 deaths
Actresses from Helsinki
Finnish film actresses
20th-century Finnish actresses
Deaths from lung cancer
Deaths from cancer in Finland